The horny nerite, Neritodryas cornea, is a species of freshwater snail, an aquatic gastropod mollusk in the family Neritidae, the nerites. 

Neritodryas cornea is the type species of the genus Neritodryas.

Description

Human use
It is a part of ornamental pet trade for freshwater aquaria.

References 

 Brandt, R. A. M. (1974). The non-marine aquatic Mollusca of Thailand. Archiv für Molluskenkunde. 105: i-iv, 1-423
 Eichhorst T.E. (2016). Neritidae of the world. Volume 2. Harxheim: Conchbooks. Pp. 696-1366

External links
 https://biodiversitylibrary.org/page/726886
 Lesson, R. P. (1830-1831). Voyage autour du monde, exécuté par ordre du Roi, sur la corvette de Sa Majesté, La Coquille, pendant les années 1822, 1823, 1824 et 1825. Zoologie, 2

Neritidae
Gastropods described in 1758
Taxa named by Carl Linnaeus